My Own Private River is a re-contextualized adventure drama film of My Own Private Idaho (1991). Using footage shot and directed by Gus Van Sant in 1990, the new edit gives James Franco and Van Sant a shared director credit. The project is in tribute to Franco's favorite actor, River Phoenix. Franco called My Own Private Idaho one of his favorite movies and praised River's performance as the actor's best.

My Own Private River had its premieres at the Hollywood Theatre on September 25, 2011, at the Walter Reade Theater on February 19, 2012 and at the Film Society of Lincoln Center on February 24, 2012.

Cast

 River Phoenix as Michael "Mikey" Waters
 Keanu Reeves as Scott Favor
 James Russo as Richard Waters
 Vana O'Brien as Sharon Waters
 Rodney Harvey as Gary
 William Richert as Bob Pigeon
 Grace Zabriskie as Alena
 Chiara Caselli as Carmela
 Flea as Budd
 Udo Kier as Hans

Development and release
In 2007, at a conference meeting in New York City for the 2008 film Milk, Franco and Van Sant responded to questions about Franco's favourite movie, which turned out to be My Own Private Idaho. Van Sant admired Franco's appreciation for the film, while Van Sant enticed Franco to give him a tour of the film's locations in Portland, Oregon. Franco expressed his wish to Van Sant to  access the outtake footage for the original film.

Van Sant showed Franco the collection of unseen film. Franco was interested to digitize and assemble the footage as a re-contextualized film. About the unseen footage, Franco stated, “I edited the film as I imagined Gus might have if he made My Own Private Idaho today,”

In an interview in February, 2012, Franco said he was not sure about releasing the film on DVD, yet sought approval by New Line Cinema who was against the idea, Franco stated that they didn't want us to compete with the final film.

Music
 
Songs that play during the film include:
 R.E.M – "Alligator Aviator Autopilot Antimatter"
 R.E.M – "Überlin"
 R.E.M – "Blue"

References

2011 films
Films shot in Oregon
Films set in Portland, Oregon
Films shot in Washington (state)
Films set in Seattle
Films set in Rome
Films shot in Rome
2010s drama road movies
American drama road movies
Films directed by Gus Van Sant
Films directed by James Franco
2010s adventure drama films
2010s avant-garde and experimental films
2010s buddy films
2010s coming-of-age drama films
2011 independent films
2011 LGBT-related films
American adventure drama films
American avant-garde and experimental films
American coming-of-age drama films
American independent films
American LGBT-related films
Buddy drama films
2010s English-language films
Films about male prostitution in the United States
Films about sleep disorders
Gay-related films
Narcolepsy in fiction
2011 drama films
2010s American films